No. 421 Squadron RCAF was a unit of the Royal Canadian Air Force. It was the last RCAF fighter squadron to be formed in the UK during World War II.

Establishment
Initially established at RAF Digby in April 1942 with Supermarine Spitfire Mk VA, the squadron moving to RAF Fairwood Common in May and received Spitfire Mk VB.

The squadron's motto was Bellicum cecinere ("They have sounded the war trumpet"). Its badge was, in front of two tomahawks in saltire, a Red Indian warrior.

Second World War

During 1942 the squadron was under 10 Group and flew its mission from RAF Warmwell, RAF Bolt Head, RAF Ibsley, RAF Zeals and RAF Charmy Down. In January 1943 the squadron joined the 127 (Canadian) Wing and moved to Redhill Aerodrome airfield. Late in spring of 1943 the squadron received Spitfire Mk IX and flew under the command of Wing Commander Johnnie Johnson.

In preparation for the Normandy landings the 127 Wing was assigned to RAF Second Tactical Air Force. On June 16 the squadron was along with the other squadrons of 127 Wing the first to be moved to Normandy and flew air superiority missions. After the allied breakout and quick advance towards the Reich 421 squadron was based in Evere in Belgium by October 1944. During December 1944 the squadron received Spitfire XVI. In 1945 the unit participated in the liberation of the Netherlands, before moving into Germany. At the end of the war the unit had achieved over 90 aerial victories.

Postwar

Having been disbanded shortly after the war the squadron was re-activated on 15 September 1949 at Chatham flying Vampire aircraft from bases in the UK and later flying Canadair Sabres from Grostenquin, France. In 1962 it was equipped with CF-104 Starfighters and in 1967 the squadron moved to Zweibrücken becoming part of 1 Air Division RCAF (later renamed 1 Canadian Air Group) based at CFB Baden-Soellingen, West Germany. During the early 1980s it was equipped with CF-18 Hornets. At the end of the Cold War the squadron was disbanded and its aircraft and personnel returned to Canada.

References

External links

Royal Canadian Air Force squadrons
Canadian Article XV squadrons of World War II
Military units and formations established in 1942